This article lists the current leaders of the Chinese Olympic Committee.

Leadership

Advisory group

References

China at the Olympics